Orientalis, oriental in Latin, may refer to :
 a Yersinia pestis biovar thought to correspond to the third plague pandemic
and also:
 Francia Orientalis, the realm allotted to Louis the German by the 843 Treaty of Verdun
 Marcha Orientalis, the Latin name for the (Bavarian) Eastern March, that became the Margraviate of Austria
 Marcha Orientalis, the Latin name for the Saxon Eastern March
 Opera Orientalis, a military intelligence operation carried out during the Yugoslav Wars in August 1991
 Patrologia Orientalis, an attempt to create a comprehensive collection of the writings by eastern Church Fathers in Syriac, Armenian and Arabic, Coptic, Ge'ez, Georgian, and Slavonic
 Terra orientalis (Osterland), a historical region in Germany situated between the Elbe and Saale rivers to the north of Pleissnerland

See also 
 List of Roman cognomina

de:Orientalis